The Potamoi ("Rivers") are the gods of rivers and streams of the earth in Greek mythology.

Mythology
The river gods were the 3000 sons of the great earth-encircling river Oceanus and his wife Tethys and the brothers of the Oceanids. They were also the fathers of the Naiads. The river gods were depicted in one of three forms: a man-headed bull, a bull-headed man with the body of a serpent-like fish from the waist down, or as a reclining man with an arm resting upon an amphora jug pouring water.

Notable river gods include:
 Achelous, the god of the Achelous River, the largest river in Greece, who gave his daughter in marriage to Alcmaeon, and was defeated by Heracles in a wrestling contest for the right to marry Deianira.
 Alpheus, who fell in love with the nymph Arethusa, pursuing her to Syracuse, where she was transformed into a spring by Artemis.
 Asopus, father of many naiads. His daughter Aegina was carried off to the island Aegina by Zeus. Another daughter, Sinope, tricked three amorous gods into leaving her virginity intact.
 Inachus, the first king of Argos and progenitor of the Argive line through his son Argus.
 Nilus, Egyptian river god and the father of numerous daughters who mingled with the descendants of Inachus, forming a dynasty of kings in Egypt, Libya, Arabia and Ethiopia.
 Peneus, river god of Thessaly flowing from the foot of Pindus. He was the father of Daphne and Stilbe, love interests of the god Apollo.
 Scamander, who fought on the side of the Trojans during the Trojan War, and was offended when Achilles polluted his waters with the a large number of Trojan corpses. In response, he overflowed his banks, nearly drowning Achilles.
Ancient Greek poet Hesiod mentioned several river gods by name, along with their origin story, in Theogonia ("the birth of the gods"):And Tethys bare to Ocean eddying rivers, Nilus, and Alpheus, and deep-swirling Eridanus, Strymon, and Meander, and the fair stream of Ister, and Phasis, and Rhesus, and the silver eddies of Achelous, Nessus, and Rhodius, Haliacmon, and Heptaporus, Granicus, and Aesepus, and holy Simois, and Peneus, and Hermus, and Caicus fair stream, and great Sangarius, Ladon, Parthenius, Euenus, Ardescus, and divine Scamander. — Theogony, Hesiod. Translated by Hugh G. Evelyn-White (1914)

List of Potamoi
The following are the sons of Oceanus and Tethys:

See also
 List of Oceanids
 Potamides (river nymphs)

Notes

References
 Apollodorus, Apollodorus, The Library, with an English Translation by Sir James George Frazer, F.B.A., F.R.S. in 2 Volumes. Cambridge, Massachusetts, Harvard University Press; London, William Heinemann Ltd. 1921. Online version at the Perseus Digital Library.
 Hesiod, Theogony, in The Homeric Hymns and Homerica with an English Translation by Hugh G. Evelyn-White, Cambridge, Massachusetts., Harvard University Press; London, William Heinemann Ltd. 1914. Online version at the Perseus Digital Library.
 Homer, The Iliad with an English Translation by A.T. Murray, Ph.D. in two volumes. Cambridge, Massachusetts., Harvard University Press; London, William Heinemann, Ltd. 1924. Online version at the Perseus Digital Library.
 Hyginus, Gaius Julius, Astronomica, in The Myths of Hyginus, edited and translated by Mary A. Grant, Lawrence: University of Kansas Press, 1960.
 Smith, William; Dictionary of Greek and Roman Biography and Mythology, London (1873).

External links
 "Potamoi" at Theoi.com

 
Deities in classical mythology

ru:Древнегреческие речные боги